Roti Kee Keemat is a 1990 Indian Hindi-language action film directed by Ramesh Ahuja, starring Mithun Chakraborty, Kimi Katkar in the lead roles.

Plot
Shankar is a village boy loves Bijli. His mission is to help the needy persons. He established a shelter for orphans but Jagavar Chaudhry, local goon tries to disrupts Shankar's mission.

Cast
Mithun Chakraborty as Shankar
Kimi Katkar as Bijli
Pran as Inspector / Police Commissioner R.K. Mathur
Sadashiv Amrapurkar as Jagavar / J.K.
Gulshan Grover as Inspector Dabholkar
Puneet Issar as D’Souza
Bob Christo as Bob
Rana Jung Bahadur as Rocky
Dinesh Hingoo as Politician
Jagdish Raj as Chief Commissioner of Police
Viju Khote as Viju
Anjana Mumtaz as Sharda Mathur
Manik Irani as Goon
Raj Tilak as Sangha

Soundtrack
Lyrics: Indeevar

Trivia
Mithun appeared in Drag in the Usha Uthup sung song " Dekho 36-24-36... Ankhon se peele ".

References

External links
 
 http://ibosnetwork.com/asp/filmbodetails.asp?id=Roti+Kee+Keemat
 http://www.webmallindia.com/buy_dvd_online-movie-ROTI+KEE+KEEMAT-p-12304.html

1990 films
1990s Hindi-language films
Cross-dressing in Indian films
Films scored by Bappi Lahiri
Indian action films